La Chimba National Reserve is a national reserve of Chile.

The nature reserve is located in the Antofagasta Region of northern Chile.

See also
List of the protected areas of Chile
Protected areas of Antofagasta Region
Atacama Desert

References

National reserves of Chile
Protected areas of Antofagasta Region